The Letterenhuis ("House of Literature") is a Belgian non-profit organization located in Antwerp. The Letterenhuis collects and archives information of Flemish artists, musicians, and writers, as well as portraits concerning Flemish culture as from 1750. The Letterenhuis fulfills two tasks: on the one hand it is an archiving and documentation centre and on the other hand it is a museum. The most interesting part of its collection are the manuscripts of famous Belgian authors like Hendrik Conscience, Willem Elsschot and the contemporary writer Tom Lanoye. In 2012 the Letterenhuis featured a theme exhibition about Louis Paul Boon to honor his one hundredth birth year.

History
The organization was founded in 1933 as the Museum van de Vlaamsche Letterkunde ("Museum of Flemish Literature"). The collection was based on the Conscience-archive and the  legacy. Just after World War II the name was changed into Archief en Museum voor het Vlaamse Cultuurleven ("Archive and Museum for the Flemish Cultural Life"). In 2002, the name was changed into the present Letterenhuis. The Letterenhuis moved into its present location in 1958, which is located adjacent to its original location in the Minderbroedersstraat. Since 2004 the Letterenhuis is acknowledged as the cultural archive for the Flemish literary heritage.

Main Exhibition
The Letterenhuis contains a huge archive of manuscripts, notes, diaries, etc. These objects are complemented by biographies about Flemish authors and scientific publications about their works. The museum also draws the attention to the writing process and the way literature is received by critics and the public. The emphasis of the exhibitions is on contemporary literature, starting from 1950.

Theme Exhibitions

Gallery

See also
 Arkprijs van het Vrije Woord
 Belgian literature
 Flemish literature

Sources

 

Archives in Belgium
Museums in Antwerp